The Blanche River (French: "Rivière Blanche") is a stream flowing in the municipalities of Saint-Ubalde, Saint-Thuribe, Saint-Alban and Saint-Casimir, in the Portneuf Regional County Municipality, in the administrative region from Capitale-Nationale, to Quebec, to Canada.

The White River flows mainly in an agricultural environment, while passing near the villages of Saint-Ubalde and Saint-Casimir.

The surface of the Blanche River (except the rapids areas) is generally frozen from the beginning of December to the end of March, but the safe circulation on the ice is generally made from the end of December to the beginning of March.

Geography 
This basin represents 37% of that of the Noire River.

The Blanche river rises at Lac Blanc (altitude of 143 m), in Saint-Hubalde. This lake is supplied with:
 north side: the "Rivière des Pins" which receives the waters of Lac des Pins (altitude of ), located further north. The latter supplies the discharge from a series of lakes: Gervais, "du Canard", Saint-Laurent, "de la Galette" and at l'Équerre;
 northeast side: the outlet of Emerald Lake (located near the mountain of Lac Richard);
 southwest side: the outlet of a series of lakes: Rond, "à Francis" (155 m), Travers (161 m), Perron (189 m), Perreault (185 m)) and the Lac Froid (197 m).

With 3.75 km long, Lac Blanc is renowned for its resort and recreational tourism activities, including camping and nautical activities. The mouth is located southwest of Lac Blanc.

Course in Saint-Ubalde

From the mouth of Lac Blanc, the Blanche river turns southeast for 1.1 km to the mouth of Boisvert stream (note: approximately 215 m after the mouth, the current crosses the Morissette Falls). Then the river goes south for 9.1 km passing northeast of the village of Saint-Ubalde, then recovering the waters of the "arm fafan" and "Morel stream".

The river continues its descent over 1.3 km to the mouth of the Weller River (receiving the waters of Carillon Lake, Sept-Îles), Anguilla and "Lac en Coeur"). From there, the waters flow south over a segment of 360 m to reach the limit of Saint-Thuribe.

Course in Saint-Thuribe, Saint-Alban and Saint-Casimir

Then, the river flows 4.4 km to the southeast in Saint-Thuribe. Then the river makes a 2.1 km foray into Saint-Alban by crossing the Chute at Bélanger and passing by a saw, to return to flow in Saint-Thuribe. From this municipal limit, the river descends for 1.25 km to the mouth of the outlet of Lac Travers. Then, the river flows 8.2 km south in Saint-Thuribe to its confluence where it flows on the west bank of the Black River. From there, this last 1.8 km route to the south to empty into the Sainte-Anne River, near Grandbois Island, at the eastern edge of the village from Saint-Casimir. This confluence is located 4.2 km (measured by the current) upstream from the limit of the MRC of Portneuf Regional County Municipality or 8.1 km upstream from the bridges of Autoroute 40 or 11.5 km upstream from the mouth of the Sainte-Anne River.

Land use 
The Blanche River watershed is located mainly in a forest environment, with the exception of the downstream section of the river, i.e. in a highly agricultural environment.

Toponymy
The toponym "Rivière Blanche" (Portneuf) was formalized on December 5, 1968, at the Place Names Bank of the Commission de toponymie du Québec.

See also 
 Saint-Ubalde
 Saint-Thuribe
 Saint-Alban
 Saint-Casimir
 Portneuf Regional County Municipality
 Sainte-Anne River (Mauricie)
 Noire River (Sainte-Anne River)
 Weller River
 List of rivers of Quebec

References

Bibliography

External links 
 

Rivers of Capitale-Nationale